Roodt is a small town in the commune of Ell, in western Luxembourg.  , the town has a population of 150. Longitude : 5.82 Latitude : 49.79 Altitude : 428m

Towns in Luxembourg
Redange (canton)